Kim Myung-jun (March 5, 1994) known professionally as MJ (엠제이), is a South Korean singer, actor, and model managed under the label of Fantagio. He debuted in 2016 as the main vocalist of the South Korean six-member boy group Astro. In August 2020, he debuted as one of the five members of an idol trot group named Super Five through MBC's reality trot show Favorite Entertainment.

Life and career

2012–2015: Pre-debut 
MJ was a contestant in the 2012 JYP Entertainment X HUM Audition and won a one-year scholarship from Seoul Arts College.

MJ took part in Fantagio's iTeen, a rookie talent development program managed under the label of Fantagio. He and other members of Astro were known as iTeen Boys.

MJ along with the other members of Astro starred in a web drama series named "To be Continued" which featured the members as themselves.

2016–2019: Debut with Astro and solo activities 

MJ officially debuted as a member of Astro on February 23, 2016.

During Astro's 2nd ASTROAD To Seoul "Starlight" concert which was held on December 22–23, 2018, MJ performed his solo trot stage "Cheok Cheok". It was included in the DVD of the concert which was released in June 2019.

In February 2019, MJ sang his first OST titled "You're My Everything" for the Korean drama, My Only One.

Also in February 2019, MJ along with Jin Ju, Hyomin, Heo Kyung-hwan, Kang Tae-oh travelled to Nha Trang for the Korean travel show "Have To Go to Know".

In March 2019, MJ and Jinjin took part in the travel/variety show project of Celuv TV - Go Together, Travel Alone. The show was filmed in Saipan and includes Tony Ahn, Han Seung-yeon, Jin Jin and Kim So-hye. It was later on released in a DVD format.

In June 2019, he co-hosted Insane Quiz Show Season 2, also abbreviated as "이세퀴" and "IQS S2", with BtoB's Illhoon and Loona's Chuu.

In July 2019, MJ and Yoon San-ha were confirmed to be the MCs of the tvN D's variety talk show Blanket Kick at Night.

In August 2019, MJ appeared in King of Masked Singer as Driver Kim. Also in February 2019, MJ along with Jin Ju, Hyomin, Heo Kyung-hwan, Kang Tae-oh travelled to Nha Trang for the Korean travel show "Have To Go to Know".

2020–present: Musical debut, Super Five and solo debut
In April 2020, MJ sang another OST for the Korean drama, Eccentric! Chef Moon titled "Sweet Spring". In that same month, it was confirmed that MJ, together with 2AM's Jo Kwon, NU’EST's Ren, and Shin Joo Hyup were cast for the Korean version of the musical Everybody's Talking About Jamie. This is originally a British musical based on a true story of a teenager named Jamie, who aspires to become a drag queen. The musical was scheduled from 4 July to 11 September at LG Arts Center in Gangnam. On the September 11, 2020, MJ successfully finished his last show for the musical as Jamie.

In July 2020, MJ was cast in MBC's Favorite Entertainment.  He was selected as one of the five members of the idol trot group formed by Jang Yoon Jung and in charge of visual of the group. The project boy group debuted on MBC's Music Core on August 22, 2020 under the name Super Five (다섯장). MJ promoted with Super Five using his real name Kim Myung Jun. The group consists of Pentagon's Lee Hoe-taek, A.cian's Chu Hyeok-jin, Park Hyeong-seok and Ok Jin-wook. The group debuted with the songs "Hello" and "All Eyes on You".

In 2021, he became the only MC for the 2nd season of Fact In Star. On October 14, Fantagio confirmed that MJ will debut as a solo artist with a semi-trot song to be released in November, which features Kim Tae-yeon from Miss Trot. Young Tak was also participating in the production of said song. On October 18, it was confirmed that MJ was cast to play the role 'Daniel' in the musical 'Jack the Ripper'. MJ will play the role together with Uhm ki joon, F.T. Island's Lee Hong-ki and SF9's Inseong. The musical is slated to open on December 3 at the KEPCO Art Center in Seoul. On October 28, 2021, MJ was announced as part of G-Market's mystery romance thriller web drama called Find Me If You Can. He played the role of a long time friend with the main lead actress. It was premiered on November 9, 2021, via INSSA OPPA G YouTube Channel.

On November 3, MJ debuted as a solo artist with two songs — "Get Set Yo" and "Valet Parking". On November 29, he won in SBS's The Trot Show and is the first idol to ever win first place on The Trot Show.

Personal life 
On February 3, 2022, the agency confirmed that MJ would temporarily suspend his activities due to illness.

Military service 
MJ enlisted in the military band as part of his mandatory military service on May 9, 2022.

Discography

Composition credits 
All credits are listed under the Korea Music Copyright Association unless otherwise stated.

As Kim Myung-jun of Super Five

Filmography

Web series

Television shows

Web shows

Theater

Awards and nominations

Notes

References

External links 

 MJ on Fantagio
 MJ on Instagram

1994 births
Living people
Astro (South Korean band) members
South Korean male idols
South Korean male singers
South Korean male television actors
21st-century South Korean singers
21st-century male singers
Hanlim Multi Art School alumni
K-pop singers
21st-century South Korean male singers
Fantagio artists